Tara Dawn Holland (born October 2, 1972) is an American beauty pageant contestant, who was Miss America 1997.

Education
Holland attended Florida State University and was selected for membership in Omicron Delta Kappa in 1993. In December 2002, Holland graduated summa cum laude with her master’s degree in music education from the University of Missouri–Kansas City.

Literacy advocacy
After six years as a local literacy advocate and tutor, she took her cause to the national spotlight when she was crowned Miss America 1997. She spent the year fighting for literacy education for people of all ages and backgrounds, as well as raising funds and motivating those involved in the cause. Since her year of service, she has continued to speak for local, state, and national organizations on this critical issue.

Public appearances

In addition to traveling as a speaker, Holland has enjoyed many opportunities to perform musically. She has been featured as a vocal soloist with the Kansas City Symphony, the U.S. Air Force Band, and the NATO Band in Italy. She was also a featured vocalist in the nationally televised Boston Pops Fourth of July Celebration and the Macy's Thanksgiving Day Parade. In addition, she had the honor of singing at two of President George W. Bush's inaugural events, including the Armory Ball, the largest official Inaugural Ball.

Holland has appeared on various media outlets, including The Tonight Show with Jay Leno, Late Night with Conan O'Brien, Live with Regis and Kathie Lee, Today, Fox News Sunday with Tony Snow, Parade, People, and Focus on the Family radio show, among others. In addition to commercials, public service announcements, and her cameo role on The Nanny, some of her other highlights are the 1997 Kansan of the Year, President Bush’s Daily Point of Light #723, and the 1997 Kansas Woman of Achievement.

Personal life
Holland and her husband, former U.S. Congressman Jon Lynn Christensen, live in Franklin, Tennessee. They have two daughters, Petra and Sela.

Holland is active with youth, both in her local community and as a national sexual abstinence speaker to tens of thousands of students per year. She also sings and speaks for women’s groups, fundraisers, and churches.

Trivia
The video of her receiving her crown was shown at the beginning of the 2006 film, Little Miss Sunshine.

References

External links
 Official website
 Miss America profile
 21st Century Speakers Inc. profile

1972 births
Living people
People from Mobile, Alabama
People from Franklin, Tennessee
Miss America 1997 delegates
Miss America winners
Literacy advocates
Florida State University alumni
University of Missouri–Kansas City alumni
Musicians from Kansas
Miss America Preliminary Swimsuit winners